Caridad Jerez Castellanos (born 23 January 1991 in Palma de Mallorca) is a Spanish athlete specialising in the sprint hurdles.

Her personal bests are 12.94 seconds in the 100 metres hurdles (+1.4 m/s, Salamanca 2015) and 8.09 seconds in the 60 metres hurdles (Orense 2020).

Competition record

1Disqualified in the semifinals

References

1991 births
Living people
Spanish female hurdlers
Sportspeople from Palma de Mallorca
World Athletics Championships athletes for Spain
Athletes (track and field) at the 2016 Summer Olympics
Olympic athletes of Spain
Athletes (track and field) at the 2018 Mediterranean Games
Mediterranean Games competitors for Spain